Haplochromis megalops is a species of cichlid endemic to Lake Victoria.  This species can reach a length of  SL.

References

megalops
Fish described in 1969
Taxonomy articles created by Polbot